Jablonec can refer to several towns in central Europe:
Jablonec nad Nisou, a town in Liberec Region, Czech Republic
Jablonec nad Nisou District
FK Jablonec, an association football club based in Jablonec nad Nisou
Jablonec nad Jizerou, a town in Semily District, Liberec Region, Czech Republic
Jablonec, Pezinok District, a village in Bratislava Region, Slovakia
Jablonec, small village in Ústí nad Labem Region, Czech Republic
 Gemerský Jablonec, a village and municipality in the Rimavská Sobota District of the Banská Bystrica Region of southern Slovakia